William Dee Smith (February 9, 1933 – September 9, 2020) was a United States Navy four star admiral who served as United States Military Representative, NATO Military Committee (USMILREP) between 1991 & 1993.  Smith retired in 1993 and died in 2020.

References

United States Navy admirals
United States Naval Academy alumni
1933 births
2020 deaths
Burials at Arlington National Cemetery